IBTS may refer to:

 Irish Blood Transfusion Service
 International Baptist Theological Seminary, Prague, Czech Republic

See also
 IBT (disambiguation)